The London Cowboys were a rock'n'roll band who performed from 1980 to 1987. Formed by Steve Dior (vocals) and Barry Jones, formerly of The Idols, the band was somewhat of an enigma. Although these two remained constant and wrote the material, they were joined by a constant succession of other artists in the revolving roster. These included Glen Matlock from the Sex Pistols, Terry Chimes from The Clash, Tony James from Generation X, Phil Lewis and Gerry Laffy from Girl, Jerry Nolan from the New York Dolls, Alan D'Alvarez (reportedly of Scotland yard's D10 section) and a dozen other less notable players.

Career
Signed to Underdog Records, The London Cowboys released their debut album, Animal Pleasure in 1982, with the title and the cover photo taken from the film The Tattered Dress to set the tone for the record.

They recorded several more records, including their mini album Tall in the Saddle, and the live album On Stage. There were plans for a fourth record under the working title Whip It Out. Although the third album was never formally released, it spawned one last single "Dance Crazy". This featured the final incarnation of the band - Steve Dior, Barry Jones, Gerry Laffy, Alan D'Alvarez and Jerry Nolan.

After the Cowboys, Steve formed a band called Filthy Lucre which recorded an album Popsmear, and appeared on the Johnny Thunders Tribute CD along with Jeff Dahl, Dogs, Cosa Nostra Band, Bebe Buell, Barry Jones, Jet Boys, Syl Sylvain. Steve also played in The Delinquents. Glen Matlock reformed the Sex Pistols with John Lydon, Steve Jones and Paul Cook. Alan D'Alvarez briefly joined London pseudo punk rockers Better Than You before returning to obscurity.  Barry is now living in LA.

On September 3, 2008, Jungle Records released a compilation of The London Cowboys, Relapse, which features material from both studio albums, various singles, b-sides, demos from Whip It Out, and four track from The Idols.

Discography

Studio Albums
1982 – Animal Pleasure (Underdog Records)
1984 – Tall in the Saddle (Underdog Records) (12", mini album)

Live Album
1986 – On Stage (Underdog Records)

Compilations

1992 – Long Time Coming (Radio Active Records)
1992 – The Underdog Recordings (Underdog Records)
1992 – Wow Wow Oui Oui (Skydog Records)
2008 – Relapse (Jungle Records)

Studio Singles
1980 – "Shunting on the Night Shift" b/w "Anything You Want" (Underdog Records)
1981 – "It Never Ends" b/w "Hook Line and Sinker" (Underdog Records)
1983 – "Street Full of Soul" b/w "Let's Get Crazy" (Flicknife Records)
1983 – "Let's Get Crazy" b/w "Street Full of Soul" (Skydog Records)
1983 – "Hook Line & Sinker" b/w "Saigon" (Underdog Records)
1984 – "Centerfold" b/w "Courtesan (She's Real Hot Man)" (Underdog Records)
1985 – "It Takes Time" b/w "Courtesan" (Poko Rekords)
1987 – "Dance Crazy" b/w "Bleed Me" (Rebel Rec.)

References

External links 
The London Cowboys at Discogs

English rock music groups
Musical groups established in 1980
Musical groups from London